Isopogon formosus, commonly known as rose coneflower, is a species of flowering plant in the family Proteaceae and is endemic to the south-west of Western Australia. It is a shrub with divided leaves with cylindrical segments, and spherical to oval heads of pink or red flowers.

Description

Taxonomy
Isopogon formosus was first formally described in 1810 by Robert Brown and the description was published in Transactions of the Linnean Society. The specific epithet (formosus) is a Latin word meaning "beautifully-formed" or "handsome".

In 1995, Donald Bruce Foreman described two subspecies of I. formosus in the Flora of Australia, and the names are accepted by the Australian Plant Census:
 Isopogon formosus subsp. dasylepis (Meisn.) Foreman that has generally hairier stems, leaves and involucral bracts than the autonym and flowers mainly from June to December;
 Isopogon formosus R.Br. subsp. formosus is more or less glabrous and mainly flowers from May to November.

Subspecies dasylepis was originally described in 1856 by Carl Meissner as I. formosus var. dasylepis in de Candolle's Prodromus Systematis Naturalis Regni Vegetabilis.

In a 2017 paper in the journal Nuytsia, Rye and Hislop reduced I. heterophyllus to a synonym of I. formosus subsp. formosus, but the change has not been accepted by the Australian Plant Census as at November 2020.

Distribution and habitat
Rose coneflower grows in a range of soils in swampy places, rocky outcrops and on sandplains mainly between Bunbury and Esperance in the Esperance Plains and Jarrah Forest biogeographic regions. Subspecies dasylepis occurs between Busselton, Noggerup and the Scott River and subsp. formosus in near-coastal areas between Walpole and Hopetoun and from Dalyup to Cape Arid National Park.

Conservation status
Subspecies formosus is classified as "not threatened" but subsp. dasylepis is classified as "Priority Three" by the Government of Western Australia Department of Parks and Wildlife meaning that it is poorly known and known from only a few locations but is not under imminent threat.

Use in horticulture
Isopogon formosus requires excellent drainage and full sun. It will not tolerate long periods of dryness or heavy frost.

References 

formosus
Eudicots of Western Australia
Endemic flora of Western Australia
Plants described in 1810
Taxa named by Robert Brown (botanist, born 1773)